Chatchai Sasakul (born February 5, 1970) is a Thai former professional boxer who competed between 1991 to 2008. He held the WBC flyweight title from May 1997 to December 1998. Aside from being a professional boxer, he is also a practitioner in snooker.

Early life
He was born in Nakhon Ratchasima Province. But the family has moved to live in the Khlong Toei slum zone 9 in Khlong Toei District, Bangkok since he was young. In poverty, he was forced by his father to fight in boxing as a child starting with Muay Thai.

Muay Thai and amateur boxing career 
Sasakul martial art experience started with Muay Thai, he fought on the Bangkok circuit under the name Nuengthoranee Petchyindee (หนึ่งธรณี เพชรยินดี) in stable of Petchyindee Boxing Promotion. Under the auspices of Virat Vachirarattanawong, owner of Petchyindee Boxing Promotion, he attended high school at Bhadungsit Pittaya School in Bang Sue quarter. Which is a school that has a distinctive point is amateur boxing at the youth level. He then turned to boxing and became an amateur boxing star in Thailand. He had an amateur record of 85 fights, winning 78 of them, he won the 1989 and 1990 editions of the King's Cup where he received the Best Boxer of the competition award.

During his time as an amateur boxer, he was regarded as the favorite of Klaew Thanikhul, the famous mafia at that time that was influential in the Thai boxing industry. Thanikhul took him to nightclubs and massage parlours at night around Bangkok, and even took him to a casino in Las Vegas. Even though he was only the eleventh grader.

Olympic career 
He represented Thailand as a Light Flyweight at the 1988 Seoul Olympic Games. The  results of his fights were:
1st round bye
Defeated Luis Rolon (Puerto Rico) 3-2
Defeated Maurice Maina (Kenya) 5-0
Lost to Róbert Isaszegi (Hungary) 2-3

Professional boxing career 
Sasakul turned pro in 1991 and captured the WBC and lineal flyweight titles with a win over Yuri Arbachakov in 1997. He defended the titles twice before losing to Manny Pacquiao by knockout in 1998 to earn Pacquiao his first championship title.

On March 31, 2007, Sasakul knocked out Lito Sisnorio, a Filipino boxer. Sisnorio reportedly sustained brain injuries during the fight. The next day, following unsuccessful brain surgery, Sisnorio was pronounced dead at Piyamin Hospital in Thailand at 9:15 PM. The controversy over the match arose from the fact that Sisnorio's role in the fight was not officially sanctioned by the Philippine Games and Amusement Board. His death prompted the Board to ban all fights involving Filipino boxers in Thailand starting April 2007.

On August 30, 2008, Sasakul challenged Cristian Mijares, the WBA and WBC unified super flyweight champion. However, he stopped in three rounds. According to a doctor who provided him medication after the match, this was the Thai boxer's last career fight. What might have become a disadvantage for Sasakul was that he had to go to a second flight to Mexico through Germany after having problems with the first flight which tried to go through Hong Kong. By the time he got to Mexico, the fight was only three days away and that he experienced jet lag.

After retirement
After retirement, He had opened a mu kratha night restaurant for a while but was unsuccessful. Later, Sasakul opened his own boxing gym, Sasakul Muay Thai in Bangkok, focusing primarily on boxing with aspirations to create a new generation of Thai world boxing champions. Sasakul is also a trainer to Superbon Banchamek and to fighters in his former team Petchyindee Boxing Promotion, such as Pongsaklek Wonjongkam, Kompayak Porpramook, Panomroonglek Kratingdaenggym, Yodmongkol Vor Saengthep, Knockout CP Freshmart, Noknoi Sitthiprasert.

Professional boxing record

Muay Thai record

|- style="background:#cfc;"
| 1989-01-27 || Win||align=left| Chakawan Naruemon || Lumpinee Stadium ||  Bangkok, Thailand  || KO (Uppercut)|| 3 ||

|- style="background:#c5d2ea;"
| 1988-01-22 || Draw ||align=left| Noppadej Naruemon || Lumpinee Stadium ||  Bangkok, Thailand  || Decision || 5 || 3:00

|- style="background:#cfc;"
| 1987-02-13 || Win||align=left| Fahsathan Lukprabat || Lumpinee Stadium ||  Bangkok, Thailand  || Decision || 5 || 3:00 

|- style="background:#cfc;"
| 1987-01-10 || Win||align=left| Kangwannoi Or.Sribualoy || Lumpinee Stadium ||  Bangkok, Thailand  || Referee stoppage || 4 || 

|- style="background:#cfc;"
| 1986- || Win||align=left| Karuhat Sor.Supawan || Lumpinee Stadium ||  Bangkok, Thailand  || Decision || 5 || 3:00

|- style="background:#fbb;"
| 1985- || Loss ||align=left| Karuhat Sor.Supawan ||  || Samrong, Thailand  || Decision || 5 || 3:00
|-
| colspan=9 | Legend:

See also
List of world flyweight boxing champions

References

External links 
 
 Chatchai Sasakul at Cyber Boxing Zone
 
 

1970 births
Living people
Chatchai Singwangcha
Flyweight boxers
Boxing trainers
Chatchai Singwangcha
Chatchai Singwangcha
World Boxing Council champions
World flyweight boxing champions
Chatchai Singwangcha
Boxers at the 1988 Summer Olympics
Asian Games medalists in boxing
Chatchai Singwangcha
Boxers at the 1990 Asian Games
Medalists at the 1990 Asian Games
Chatchai Singwangcha
Chatchai Singwangcha
Chatchai Singwangcha
Southeast Asian Games medalists in boxing
Competitors at the 1987 Southeast Asian Games
Competitors at the 1989 Southeast Asian Games